Hermansville is an unincorporated community and census-designated place (CDP) in Meyer Township of Menominee County in the U.S. state of Michigan. It formed around the defunct Wisconsin Land & Lumber Company as a company town . The company's former headquarters is open as the IXL Historical Museum. US Highway 2 (US 2) passes through the north edge of the community.

Hermansville was established in 1878. The community was named for the son of the original owner of the town site.

Images

References

Census-designated places in Michigan
Census-designated places in Menominee County, Michigan
Unincorporated communities in Michigan
Unincorporated communities in Menominee County, Michigan
Marinette micropolitan area
Company towns in Michigan
Populated places established in 1878
1878 establishments in Michigan